Ethelbert Talbot Donaldson (18 March 1910–13 April 1987) was a scholar of medieval English literature, known for his 1966 translation of Beowulf and his writings on Chaucer's poetry.

Biography

Ethelbert Talbot Donaldson was born on 18 March 1910 in Bethlehem, Pennsylvania. He was educated at Harvard University, gaining his BA in 1932. He began his career by teaching languages at the Kent School in Connecticut. He was awarded a fellowship at Yale University in 1942, rising to become the  George E. Bodman Professor of English there. During the Second World War he served in the United States Air Force, rising through the ranks from private to captain. He returned repeatedly to Yale, with periods away teaching at University College London, King's College London, Columbia University, and the University of Michigan. In 1974, he and his wife Judith joined the staff of Indiana University; he became a Distinguished Professor of English there, retiring in 1980. 

Donaldson wrote a large number of books and research papers on medieval English literature, especially on Chaucer's poetry. Students of literature such as Bonnie Wheeler admired his "eloquent" criticism of Chaucer, recognising the poet's "complexity and irony".

He died on 13 April 1987, leaving his wife and a daughter, Deirdre.

Beowulf translation 

Donaldson is known also for his 1966 prose translation of Beowulf; it was widely read, especially in The Norton Anthology of English Literature, of which he was a founding editor. The scholar Hugh Magennis calls it accurate, "foreignizing" prose, using asyndetic coordination, "somewhat ponderous but ...[with a] dignified tone ... viewed by teachers as dull".

Awards and distinctions

Donaldson was awarded a "rare" two Guggenheim Fellowships and the Haskins Medal. He was elected among many other distinctions as Corresponding Fellow of the British Academy, Fellow in the American Academy of Arts and Sciences, first President of the New Chaucer Society, and President of the Medieval Academy.

Works

 Chaucer's poetry : an anthology for the modern reader. New York : Ronald Press, 1958
 Piers Plowman: the C-text and its poet. New Haven, Yale University Press, 1949 
 Speaking of Chaucer
 The Swan at the Well
 Beowulf, 1966

References 

1910 births
1987 deaths
American medievalists
Yale University faculty
Alumni of University College London
Academics of King's College London
Columbia University faculty
University of Michigan faculty
Indiana University Bloomington faculty
Harvard College alumni